E. R. Pickrell (February 18, 1858 – February 5, 1894) was an American politician in the state of Washington. He served in the Washington House of Representatives from 1889 to 1891.

References

Members of the Washington House of Representatives
1858 births
1894 deaths
People from Porter County, Indiana
19th-century American politicians